Edward Magrath may refer to:

Edward Magrath (politician) (1881–1961), Australian politician
Ted Magrath (born 1939), Australian rugby union player